Teg is a residential area in Umeå, Sweden. Teg is connected to Umeå center through two bridges, Tegsbron and Kyrkbron.

External links
Teg at Umeå Municipality

Umeå